Carlo Annovazzi (24 May 1925 – 10 October 1980) was an Italian footballer who played as a midfielder. He was usually deployed as a right-sided, central, or defensive midfielder, although he was also capable of playing in defence. A large and physically imposing player, despite his deeper playing role, he was known for his eye for goal as a footballer, and was also an accurate penalty kick taker; during his time with A.C. Milan, he successfully converted all eight of the spot kicks he took.

Club career
Throughout his club career, Annovazzi played for A.C. Milan, Atalanta, Anconitana, Pro Patria and Città di Castello. He made his Serie A debut with Milan in a 1–1 away draw against Modena on 16 December 1945. He was a member of the Milan side that won the 1950–51 Serie A title, after a 44-year title drought, as well as the Coppa Latina; he contributed to the team's title success by scoring 17 goals throughout the season, 16 of which came in Serie A, and one in the Coppa Latina.

International career
At international level, Annovazzi also represented the Italy national team at the 1950 FIFA World Cup. He made his international debut in a 3–1 home win over Czechoslovakia on 14 December 1947. In total, he made 17 appearances for Italy between 1947 and 1952, during a time in which most of the team was composed of players from the legendary Grande Torino side of the 40s, and was Italy's captain between 1951 and 1952.

Honours
Milan
Serie A: 1950–51
Coppa Latina: 1951

Individual
A.C. Milan Hall of Fame

External links

References

1925 births
1980 deaths
Italian footballers
Association football midfielders
Italy international footballers
Serie A players
Serie C players
A.C. Milan players
Atalanta B.C. players
Aurora Pro Patria 1919 players
1950 FIFA World Cup players
Footballers from Milan